Killing Silence (German:Tötendes Schweigen) is a 1920 German silent film directed by Artur Holz.

Cast
In alphabetical order
 Julius Brandt 
 Friedel Kühne 
 Nien Soen Ling
 Karl Römer
 Heinz Stieda 
 Carola Toelle 
 Erika Unruh

References

Bibliography
 Shulamith Behr, David Fanning & Douglas Jarman. Expressionism Reassessed. Manchester University Press, 1993.

External links

1920 films
Films of the Weimar Republic
Films directed by Artur Holz
German silent feature films
German black-and-white films